Festuca komarovii is a species of grass in the family Poaceae. It is native to Buryatiya, Irkutsk, and Mongolia. It is perennial and mainly grows in temperate biomes. It was first published in 1955.

References

komarovii
Flora of Mongolia
Flora of Irkutsk Oblast
Flora of Siberia
Plants described in 1955